Elizabeth Dickson or Elizabeth Dalzac ( – 30 April 1862) was a British woman who raised the British public profile of the Christian white slaves held in north Africa by the Barbary Slave Trade.

Life
Elizabeth Dalzac was born in Ghana in about 1793. Her father had been sent to Africa as a doctor but he turned to trading slaves in his spare time. One later source presumes her mother to have been "a wench". Her father rose to be governor of Cape Coast Castle and he wrote an apology for the slave trade called The History of Dahomy.

Elizabeth was sent on a visit to her brother, Edward in Algiers. She was a teenager but her brother was an agent and consul for the Portuguese government. She was alarmed to hear of the white slaves captured by the Barbary pirates. The pirates there had Christian prisoners from Spain, France, Portugal and Britain. Together with those at Tripoli and Tunis there were thousands of captive slave. Dalzac's letters to British journalists attracted the attention of the Knights Liberators and Anti-Piratical Society. This organisation awarded her with membership and a gold medal.

The plight of these people was taken up by the politician Henry Brougham in the British Parliament and in August 1826 the slave trade in Algiers was obliged to release 3,000 Christian slaves following the Bombardment of Algiers by a force led by Lord Exmouth. By this time Dalzel had married John Dickson and she was a mother to at least one of the six children she is known to have had.

Dickson died a widow in Tripoli in 1862.

References

1862 deaths
19th-century Ghanaian people
1790s births
19th-century British philanthropists